Arvo Kunto Viljanti (until 1935 named Viklund, 24 August 1900 in Pargas – 6 July 1974) was a Finnish historian.

Viljanti had earned a PhD and from 1962 worked as a professor at the University of Åbo. He was specialized in Swedish–Finnish military history of the 16th and 17th centuries.

References

External links
Bibliography at the Swedish National Library

1900 births
1974 deaths
20th-century Finnish historians
Academic staff of Åbo Akademi University